The Hawaiian hawk or io (Buteo solitarius) is a raptor in the genus Buteo endemic to Hawaii, currently restricted to the Big Island. The io is one of two extant birds of prey that are native to Hawaii, the other being the pueo (Hawaiian short-eared owl)  and fossil evidence indicates that it inhabited the island of Hawaii, Molokai, Oahu, Maui and Kauai at one time. Today, it is known to breed only on the Big Island, in stands of native ōhia lehua (Metrosideros polymorpha) trees. The species was protected as an endangered species in the United States, but was delisted in 2020. However, the IUCN classifies the species as Near Threatened.

Description
The female, which weighs  on average, is larger than the male, which averages . Two color phases exist: a dark phase (dark brown head, breast, and underwings), and a light color phase (dark head, light breast and light underwings). Feet and legs are yellowish in adults and greenish in juveniles. During breeding season one of the pair, possibly the female, has a distinctive yellow forecap area just above the upper mandible.

Threats
Common threats to the io are illegal shootings, the degradation of their native forest habitat, poisoning, vehicle collisions, starvation, and predation from other animals.

Lifestyle
This solitary hawk remains in and defends its territories year round. They nest from March through September, and usually lay only one egg but sometimes they could lay up to three in their clutch. The female does the majority of sitting during the 38 days of incubation, while the male does the majority of the hunting. After the egg is hatched, the female only allows the male to visit when delivering food to the nest. The chick fledges at seven or eight weeks. Fifty to seventy percent of the nests successfully fledge young.

The io usually hunts from a stationary position, but can also dive on prey from the air. Due to Hawaii having few native land mammals (The Hawaiian hoary bat is Hawaii's only native terrestrial mammal), its original diet presumably consisted mainly of smaller birds such as the flightless ducks and rails that once inhabited Hawaii. Today it feeds largely on introduced animals such as rats, lizards, and game birds, as well as invertebrates such as insects. It will also feed on the Hawaiian crow, a Hawaiian bird which is extinct in the wild. They are opportunistic predators and are versatile in their feeding habits. They have a shrill and high-pitched call much like their Hawaiian name: "eeeh-oh." They are very noisy during the breeding season. Io are strong fliers.

In Hawaiian culture
The Hawaiian hawk was one of many birds unleashed in the third period of creation (wā) mentioned in the Kumulipo. It was a royal symbol in Hawaiian legend, and it is sometimes called iolani ("exalted hawk"), which was the name of Kamehameha IV and the Iolani Palace.

References

External links

BirdLife Species Factsheet.

Buteo
Endemic birds of Hawaii
Birds of prey
Birds described in 1848
Taxa named by Titian Peale
ESA endangered species